is a former Japanese pop singer and songwriter. She recorded for the Giza Studio label.

Biography
In 2001 Sugazaki won the Grand Prix Award in Miss Pure Pure Audition 2001 and made a cover appearance for Pure 2x magazine.

In 2002 Sugazaki won GIZA studio's Super Starlight contest. She sang Mai Kuraki's "Stand Up". On July 17 she participated as a guest vocalist on the compilation album Giza studio Mai-K & Friends Hotrod Beach Party.

On July 30 she debuted withsingle "Beginning dream", which was written by Aika Ohno and Yoshinobu Ohga from the band Nothin' but love. The song was used in the advertising campaign for The Music 272 channel program SKY PerfecTV.

In May 2003, Sugazaki released her final single "Koigokoro" which was used as an ending theme for Anime television series Detective School Q. In October she released her first full album Beginning. In November she covered "Ichigo Hakusho" wo Mou Ichido originally by Van Van. The recording appeared on cover album The Hit Parade produced by Tak Matsumoto from rock band B'z.

In 2004 and 2005 Sugazaki regularly appeared on Pan Koujou Thursday Live sessions.

In February 2006 Sugazaki last updated her column corner and one year later was deleted from Giza artist official website.

In 2011 Sugazaki's debut single, Beginning dream, appeared on Giza studio compilation album GIZA studio presents Girls. In 2013 songwriter Aika Ohno covered this song on her album Silent Passage with a new arrangement.

Discography

Albums

Singles

Other appearances

Magazine Interviews
From Music Freak Magazine:
Vol.92 2002/7
Vol.96 2002/11
Vol.97 2002/12
Vol.101 2003/4
Vol.102 2003/5
Vol.106 2003/9
Vol.107 2003/10

From J-Groove Magazine:
September/2002
January/2003
July/2003

References

External links
Official website: (WebArchived) Wayback Machine

Official Musing page 菅崎茜

1989 births
Living people
Being Inc. artists
Japanese lyricists
20th-century Japanese women singers
20th-century Japanese singers